Southwest University (SWU) is a private for-profit university located in Kenner, Louisiana. Founded in 1982, the university offered associate degrees, bachelor's degrees, master's degrees, and certificate programs.

Academics
Southwest University offers associate degrees in business administration, criminal justice and general studies; bachelor's degrees in business administration, criminal justice, human resource management, international business, leadership and management, management, marketing, organizational management; master's degrees in business administration, criminal justice and organizational management and it has certificate programs.

History
Southwest University was founded in 1982.

On August 29, 2005, the offices of the university were completely crushed by Hurricane Katrina. The university facilitated understudies from substitute offices for over two years while the offices were reconstructed.

Accreditation
Southwest University was first registered with Louisiana Board of Regents in 1983 and was accredited by the Distance Education Accrediting Commission and the Council for Higher Education Accreditation until March 2019. All degrees from Southwest University are recognized by the US Department of Education.

References

Distance education institutions based in the United States
Private universities and colleges in Louisiana